Pagliero may refer to:

Pagliero, Cuneo, a village in the Province of Cuneo, Italy

People with the surname
Leonard Pagliero (1913–2008), British stationer and chairman of The Kennel Club
Ludmila Pagliero (born 1983), Argentine ballet dancer 
Marcello Pagliero (1907–1980), Italian film director

Italian-language surnames